Hesham Ramadan Neymar (born January 1, 1996, in Faiyum) is an Egyptian professional footballer who plays as a striker for Alassiouty Sport. Alassiouty bought Ramadan from Fayoum SC in 2016 for 75,000 Egyptian pounds, he signed a 5-year contract.

References

1996 births
Living people
Egyptian footballers
Association football forwards
Pyramids FC players